Mabiala is a surname. Notable people with the surname include:

Charlevy Mabiala (born 1996), Congolese footballer
Larrys Mabiala (born 1987), French footballer
Pascal Tsaty Mabiala, Congolese politician
Pierre Mabiala, Congolese politician
Youlou Mabiala (born 1947), Congolese musician
Surnames of Congolese origin

Kongo-language surnames